Spring Hill is a city in Warren County, Iowa, United States. The population was 68 at the time of the 2020 census. It is part of the Des Moines–West Des Moines Metropolitan Statistical Area.

History
Spring Hill was laid out in 1872.

Geography
Spring Hill is located at  (41.412038, -93.649175), along the Middle River.

Demographics

2010 census
As of the census of 2010, there were 63 people in 28 households, including 15 families, in the city. The racial makup of the city was 98.4% White and 1.6% African American.

Of the 28 households 28.6% had children under the age of 18 living with them, 25.0% were married couples living together, 17.9% had a female householder with no husband present, 10.7% had a male householder with no wife present, and 46.4% were non-families. 32.1% of households were one person and 10.7% were one person aged 65 or older. The average household size was 2.25 and the average family size was 2.93.

The median age was 41.8 years. 19% of residents were under the age of 18; 11.2% were between the ages of 18 and 24; 26.9% were from 25 to 44; 25.4% were from 45 to 64; and 17.5% were 65 or older. The gender makeup of the city was 55.6% male and 44.4% female.

2000 census
As of the census of 2000, there were 92 people in 31 households, including 23 families, in the city. The racial makup of the city was 98.91% White and 1.09% Asian.

Of the 31 households 48.4% had children under the age of 18 living with them, 58.1% were married couples living together, 16.1% had a female householder with no husband present, and 22.6% were non-families. 19.4% of households were one person and none had someone living alone who was 65 or older. The average household size was 2.97 and the average family size was 3.42.

The age distribution was 34.8% under the age of 18, 6.5% from 18 to 24, 30.4% from 25 to 44, 26.1% from 45 to 64, and 2.2% 65 or older. The median age was 32 years. For every 100 females, there were 84.0 males. For every 100 females age 18 and over, there were 100.0 males.

The median household income was $33,750 and the median family income  was $31,875. Males had a median income of $22,500 versus $25,000 for females. The per capita income for the city was $11,671. There were 10.5% of families and 10.7% of the population living below the poverty line, including 14.8% of under eighteens and none of those over 64.

References

Cities in Warren County, Iowa
Cities in Iowa
Des Moines metropolitan area
1872 establishments in Iowa